Charmaine Neville (born March 31, 1956) is a New Orleans-based jazz singer.

Biography 
Raised Catholic, she is the daughter of Charles Neville of The Neville Brothers. 

She is the lead singer of the Charmaine Neville Band, a jazz and funk band based in New Orleans. Other musicians in the Charmaine Neville Band include Amasa Miller, Detroit Brooks, Gerald French and Jesse Boyd.

Neville was in the news due to the aftermath of Hurricane Katrina, when the failure of the Federal levees swamped the city of New Orleans.  Media reported her tale of witnessing cannibalism, alligator attacks, rape and eventual escape via a commandeered transit bus.

Solo albums
(1992) It's About Time
(1992) All the Way Live at Snug Harbor 
(1996) Up Up Up 
(1996) Live at Bourbon Street Music Club (aka Live in Brazil) 
(1998) Queen of the Mardi Gras 
(2007) Jazz Fest Live 2007

Album contributions
(1981) The Neville Brothers "Fiyo On The Bayou"
(1988) "New New Orleans Music: Jump Jazz" with Ramsay McLean and the Survivors
(1992) The Reggie Houston - Amasa Miller Trio "The Gazebo Sessions"
(1992) "Christmas In New Orleans - R&B, Jazz and Gospel"
(1996) Andrei Codrescu "Valley of Christmas"
(2000) "New Prohibition" compilation
(2000) Marva Wright "Marva"
(2001) Freddy Omar "Latin Party in New Orleans"
(2006) Nils Lofgren and Joe Sample "Creole Love Call"
(2006) Mitch Woods "Big Easy Boogie"
(2007) James "12" Andrews and The Crescent City Allstars "People Get Ready Now"

References

External links

A Survivor's Story: New Orleans resident and Jazz musician Charmaine Neville recalls the horror of surviving Hurricane Katrina

1956 births
20th-century African-American women singers
American funk singers
American jazz singers
Jazz musicians from New Orleans
Living people
Rhythm and blues musicians from New Orleans
Singers from Louisiana
21st-century African-American people
21st-century African-American women

African-American Catholics